Ritual of Evil is a 1970 American made-for-television drama horror film directed by Robert Day and starring Louis Jourdan. It was made as a sequel to Fear No Evil (1969), which also starred Louis Jourdan as Dr. Sorrell.

Plot
Psychiatrist Dr. David Sorrell (Jourdan) treats young heiress Loey Wiley (Belinda Montgomery), whose parents have died under mysterious circumstances.  His investigation uncovers a cult, led by a powerful witch, Leila Barton (Diana Hyland).  Things grow complicated as Sorrell and the witch fall in love.

Cast
 Louis Jourdan as David Sorrell 
 Anne Baxter as Jolene Wiley 
 Diana Hyland as Leila Barton 
 John McMartin as Edward Bolander 
 Wilfrid Hyde-White as Harry Snowden 
 Belinda Montgomery as Loey Wiley 
 Carla Borelli as Aline Wiley 
 Georg Stanford Brown as Larry Richmond
 Regis Cordic as The Sheriff 
 Dehl Berti as Mora
 Richard Alan Knox as Hippie
 Johnny Williams as Newscaster
 Jimmy Joyce as 1st Reporter
 James LaSane as 2nd Reporter

See also
 List of American films of 1970

References

External links

 
Review at Conjure Cinema

1970 television films
1970 films
1970 horror films
American horror drama films
American horror television films
Films scored by Billy Goldenberg
Films about cults
Occult detective fiction
American drama television films
1970s American films